An attrition test is a test carried out to measure the resistance of a granular material to wear.  An example of a material subjected to an attrition test are stones used in road construction, indicating the resistance of the material to being broken down under road traffic.  Heterogeneous catalysts are also subjected to attrition tests to determine their physical performance in a heterogeneous catalytic reactor.

The test itself involves agitating the particles, typically by tumbling within a drum, vibration, or with jets of gas to simulate a fluidised bed.  After a specified time, the material is sieved and the sieved material weighed to measure the proportion of material which has been reduced to below a certain size (referred to as 'fines').  The specifics of the test are defined by various standards as applicable to the purpose in question, such as those defined by ASTM.

Roads
Tribology